Henry Herbert Horsey (May 31, 1871 – January 6, 1942) was a Canadian athlete, businessman and Senator.

Born in Kingston, Ontario, the son of Henry Hodge Horsey and Amey Ann Rose, Horsey attended Queen's University at Kingston, Ontario where he was noted as a scholar and athlete as a member of the school's championship rugby teams. He went into business in Ottawa. In 1896, he married Florence Cook.

A friend of Sir Wilfrid Laurier, he was defeated in three attempts to win election to the House of Commons of Canada. He was a Laurier Liberal candidate in Prince Edward during the 1917 federal election and a Liberal candidate in 1921 and again in 1926, the last time in Prince Edward—Lennox.

He was appointed to the Senate of Canada in 1928 by William Lyon Mackenzie King.

In his professional life, Horsey was active in the insurance and brokerage business and toured East Asia for his company. He was also a director of Ottawa Light, Heat and Power Company and the Ottawa Electric Railway Company. Horsey died in Kingston at the age of 70.

His brother Edward Henry served in the House of Commons.

References

External links
 

1871 births
1942 deaths
People from Kingston, Ontario
Canadian senators from Ontario
Liberal Party of Canada senators
Candidates in the 1917 Canadian federal election
Candidates in the 1921 Canadian federal election
Candidates in the 1926 Canadian federal election
Liberal Party of Canada candidates for the Canadian House of Commons